Vanessa Ayala (Art by Ayala) is an American visual artist and based in New York City.

Early life 
Ayala is a Colombian-American artist of Indigenous ancestry. She attended a high school dedicated to the performing arts. She earned a scholarship to attend the California College of Art in San Francisco, where she trained in classical fine art and motion graphics graduating with a Bachelor of Fine Arts. Through her art she has amassed a following of 50 thousand followers across social media platforms.

Art 
Much of Ayala’s art is influenced by and a reflection of pop culture. She describes her style as an exploration of divine feminine energy drawing inspiration from her native ancestry and representation. Her biggest inspirations include: Andy Warhol, Kehinde Wiley, Selena. Ayala enjoys painting large vibrant portraits of female celebrities and pop culture icons. Her painted portraits include Selena and Frida Kahlo. Her work seeks to explore ideas of self love and representation.

Exhibitions 
Her work has been featured in multiple exhibitions, including a 2017 exhibition held by The Selena Museum, in Corpus Christi, Texas. The exhibition featured fan art. Her work was featured in Fashion Design of Latin America (FDLA) and Art Basel’s Miami exhibition, Arte & Moda 2021.

References

Further reading 
 Voyage Kansas City feature - https://voyagekc.com/interview/life-work-with-art-by-ayala-of-kansas-city/
 Pop Sugar Interview (8 Latinas Embracing their Indigenous Roots) - https://www.popsugar.com/latina/8-latinas-who-are-embracing-their-indigenous-roots-48519568?stream_view=1#photo-48558348

External links 
 

Living people
Year of birth missing (living people)
21st-century American women artists
Artists from Missouri 
Artists from New York (state)
California College of the Arts alumni 
Hispanic and Latino American people
Hispanic and Latino American women in the arts
Wikipedia Student Program